Guhar Sara (also Romanized as Gūhar Sarā) is a village in Sakht Sar Rural District, in the Central District of Ramsar County, Mazandaran Province, Iran. At the 2006 census, its population was 116, in 30 families.

References 

Populated places in Ramsar County